Nathaniel Tompkins (May 17, 1879 – April 22, 1949) was an American politician and jurist from Maine. Tompkins, a Republican, was elected to five terms in the Maine Legislature, including three in the Maine House of Representatives and two in the Maine Senate. During his tenure in the House, he served as House Speaker in 1935–1936. In 1938, he was elected to the Maine Senate. After being re-elected in 1940, Tompkins was elected by his fellow State Senators to be Senate President. He was appointed as a circuit court judge mid-way through his only term as President. Four years later, on July 27, 1945, he was appointed to the Maine Supreme Judicial Court. He served in that position until his death in April 1949. He died in the Aroostook County Court House in Houlton.

Tompkins studied at Ricker Classical Institute, Colby College and Harvard Law School.

References

1879 births
1949 deaths
People from Houlton, Maine
Speakers of the Maine House of Representatives
Republican Party members of the Maine House of Representatives
Presidents of the Maine Senate
Ricker College alumni
Colby College alumni
Harvard Law School alumni
Justices of the Maine Supreme Judicial Court
Maine lawyers